Julian Clarke (born September 3, 1977) is a Canadian film editor.  Clarke was born in Vancouver. He graduated from Kitsilano Secondary School before enrolling at the University of British Columbia as a film major.  After graduating from UBC in 2000, Clarke immediately began to find work as a professional film editor.  Clarke was nominated for a 2009 Academy Award for Best Film Editing, a BAFTA Award for Best Editing, an ACE Eddie Award for Best Edited Feature Film (Dramatic), a Satellite Award for Best Editing, and an Online Film Critics Society Award for Best Editing for his work on the science-fiction film, District 9.

Filmography

References

External links
 

University of British Columbia alumni
Canadian film editors
Living people
1977 births